Fernando Carlos Maletti (17 March 1949 – 8 March 2022) was an Argentine prelate of the Catholic Church in Argentina. He served as bishop of San Carlos de Bariloche from 2001 until 2013 and as the bishop of Merlo-Moreno from 2013 until his death in 2022 at the age of 72.

Life 
Born in Buenos Aires, Maletti was ordained to the priesthood on 24 November 1973. As a priest he served in various roles:
 1973–1977 Cooperator Vicar
 1977 Formator in the Major Seminary
 1981–1983 Councilor of the Archdiocesan Council of Young Women of Catholic Action
 1983–1988 Director of the "Saint Joseph" Vocational Institute
 1988 Judge of the Interdiocesan Tribunal
 1988 Parish Priest of San Cayetano, in Buenos Aires
 1989–1990 Deputy Councilor of the Archdiocesan Council of Women of Catholic Action
 1989 Dean of Deanery 11 of Buenos Aires
 1989 Member of the College of Consultors and of the Presbyteral Council

On 20 July 2001, Maletti was appointed bishop of San Carlos de Bariloche. He received his episcopal consecration on the following 18 September from Jorge Mario Bergoglio, archbishop of Buenos Aires and later Pope Francis, with bishop of Avellaneda-Lanús, bishop of San Martín, Raúl Omar Rossi, auxiliary bishop of Buenos Aires, Horacio Ernesto Benites Astoul, and auxiliary bishop of Buenos Aires, Jorge Eduardo Lozano, serving as co-consecrators. He was installed as bishop on 22 September 2001.

On 6 May 2013, he was appointed bishop of Merlo-Moreno installed on the following 9 June.

As part of the Episcopal Conference of Argentina, Maletti served in different roles, including:
 President of the Episcopal Commission for Aid to Regions in Need
 Member of the Commission for Aborigines.
 Head of the national commission for the pastoral care of addictions and drug dependence

Maletti died on 8 March 2022 in Buenos Aires, at the age of 72. A funeral mass for Malettie was celebrated by the Archbishop of Buenos Aires and Cardinal Primate of Argentina, Mario Aurelio Poli, on 9 March at the Cathedral of Our Lady of the Rosary in Moreno.

Notes

References

External links
 
 

1949 births
2022 deaths
21st-century Roman Catholic bishops in Argentina
Roman Catholic bishops of Merlo-Moreno
Roman Catholic bishops of San Carlos de Bariloche